Horse-head fiddle may refer to any of several types of bowed string instruments which often feature a carved horse's head at the peghead:

Morin khuur, a Mongolian instrument
Gusle, a Balkan instrument
Igil, a Tuvan instrument